Borneman is a surname. Notable people with the surname include:

Ernest Borneman (1915–1995), crime writer, filmmaker, anthropologist, ethnomusicologist, psychoanalyst, sexologist, communist agitator, jazz musician and critic
Johnny Borneman III (born 1977), American stock car racing driver
Walter R. Borneman (born 1952), American historian and lawyer